Hearts Adrift is a 1914 American silent short romance film directed by Edwin S. Porter. The film is now considered lost.

Production

The film bears a great resemblance to the 1911 story As the Sparks Fly Upward by Cyrus Townsend Brady. The film did not credit Brady, who sued the studio. The film's story also bears resemblance to the 1908 novel The Blue Lagoon by Henry De Vere Stacpoole, which was filmed in 1923 and several decades later with Jean Simmons in 1948 and Brooke Shields in 1980.

The film proved to be a huge success.  Actress Mary Pickford eventually demanded a higher salary (from Adolph Zukor) as her popularity rose because of this film.

Plot
Nina (Mary Pickford) and Jack Graham (Harold Lockwood) are both marooned on a deserted island. They fall in love and eventually Nina gives birth to a child. Despite being stranded, they are very happy together. One day, Jack's wife comes to rescue him. Nina is crushed and throws herself in a volcano.

Cast
 Mary Pickford as Nina
 Harold Lockwood as Jack Graham

See also
 Mary Pickford filmography
 List of lost films

References

External links

 

1914 films
1910s romance films
American romance films
American silent feature films
American black-and-white films
Lost American films
1914 lost films
Lost romance films
Films directed by Edwin S. Porter
1910s American films